Kologo is a village and seat of the commune of Tiémala-Banimonotié in the Cercle of Bougouni in the Sikasso Region of southern Mali. The village is 25 km south of the town of Bougouni, the administrative center for the cercle.

References

Populated places in Sikasso Region